Iron Will (Swedish: Hårda viljor) is a 1923 Swedish silent drama film directed by John W. Brunius and 
starring Eugen Skjønberg, Linnéa Hillberg and Torsten Hillberg. It was shot at the Råsunda Studios in Stockholm and on location in Norway. The film's sets were designed by the art director Axel Esbensen.

Cast
 Eugen Skjønberg as 	Ove Rolandsen
 Linnéa Hillberg as 	Marie van Loos
 Torsten Hillberg as 	Fredrik Mack Jr.
 Karin Alexandersson as 	Priest's Wife
 Solveig Bang as 	Helga Levion
 Lilla Bye as Elise Mack
 Helge Kihlberg as 	Guest
 William Larsson as Levion
 Yngve Nyqvist as 	Henriksen
 Gustav Ranft as 	Fredrik Mack Sr.
 Carl Ström as 	Priest
 Albert Ståhl as Enok

References

Bibliography
 Hjort, Mette & Lindqvist, Ursula. A Companion to Nordic Cinema. John Wiley & Sons, 2016.
 Sadoul, Georges. Dictionary of Film Makers. University of California Press, 1972.

External links

1923 films
1923 drama films
Swedish drama films
Swedish silent feature films
Swedish black-and-white films
Films directed by John W. Brunius
1920s Swedish-language films
Films based on works by Knut Hamsun
Silent drama films
1920s Swedish films